Paula Goodyer (born 1947) is a Walkley Award winning Australian freelance journalist, author and health writer.

Goodyer is a former Fairfax staff journalist and was the health editor of Cleo magazine. She currently writes a blog on The Sydney Morning Herald site, Chew on this.

Awards
1992 – Walkley Award (Print) – Best Magazine Story, Cleo Magazine

Bibliography
 BodyGuard Sydney:ABC Books, 2003
 Kids & Drugs Sydney:Allen and Unwin,1998

References

Living people
Australian freelance journalists
1947 births